Radamaria is a genus of moths in the subfamily Lymantriinae. The genus was erected by Paul Griveaud in 1976.

Species
Radamaria miselioides (Kenrick, 1914)
Radamaria salvatgei Griveaud, 1977
Radamaria vadoni Griveaud, 1977
Radamaria zena (Hering, 1926)

References

Lymantriinae